Joanna Cargill, also known as Frenzy, is a fictional character, a mutant superhuman appearing in American comic books published by Marvel Comics. She has been a member of supervillain groups, including the Alliance of Evil and the Acolytes, as well as the superhero team, the X-Men.

Publication history

Frenzy first appeared in X-Factor #4 (May 1986) as a member of the Alliance of Evil, and was created by Bob Layton and Keith Pollard.

Though Joanna Cargill's first and last name have been spelled with variations such as Johanna or Cargil, her name was first mentioned in The Uncanny X-Men #298 as Joanna Cargill. Frenzy should not be confused with another Joanna Cargill, a columnist introduced in Marvel Comics Presents #27.

During a March 2, 2011 Marvel Comics Liveblog, it was revealed that Frenzy is joining X-Men: Legacy in 2011 as a member of Rogue's team of X-Men, alongside Professor X, Magneto, Legion, and Gambit.

Fictional character biography

Early life
The woman who would one day become the super-powered mutant, Frenzy, began her life as a battered child in an abusive household. Her father, an officer in the Armed Forces, despised her from birth not only because of her gender - he instead doted on his son in whom, according to Cargill, he saw a continuation of the family legacy as soldiers - but also because she was born prematurely, and was a sickly, frail child, greatly increasing the financial burdens on the family. Her mother, meanwhile, was thoroughly cowed by her husband's abuse, and did nothing to stop the beatings he would constantly inflict on his daughter for even seemingly minor infractions. One day, not long after his son was killed in action, he took his rage out on his daughter for the death of his son, seemingly wanting to beat her to death. Either her rage or her fear awakened her mutant powers as he beat her savagely, and she unintentionally punched straight through his body with a single blow, killing him instantly. Shocked at what she had done, albeit accidentally, she ran away from home.

Alliance of Evil
Originally a freelance mercenary, Frenzy joins with three other mutants — Tower, Stinger, and Timeshadow — under the employ of Apocalypse, calling themselves the Alliance of Evil. After Tower's failed attempt to kidnap the mutant Rusty Collins, Frenzy is sent and put in direct conflict with X-Factor. Frenzy is unable to convince Rusty to join the Alliance, and fled after suffering defeat from X-Factor. The Alliance later reveals they had a power-enhancing accomplice named Michael Nowlan. After he tries to escape from the Alliance, the group threatens to kill Nowlan's girlfriend, Suzy. X-Factor interferes in the Alliance's plans, eventually defeating them and putting them into custody. Frenzy and the others inevitably break out, opposing the Mutant Registration Act, but were defeated by the Beast.

After another mission battling the New Mutants alongside the Alliance, Frenzy is defeated by Warpath. Cable frees Frenzy and questions who had hired her.  She admits to being hired by A.I.M. to bodyguard Harness and Piecemeal. Cable then drops Frenzy from the helicopter they were on.

She eventually receives an invitation to join Superia's Femizons and accepted, joining the superhuman women aboard Superia's cruise-ship. She joins in the en masse attack on Captain America and Paladin, and traveled to Superia's Island to be one of her new Femizons.

Under unknown circumstances, she was once again imprisoned, but was able to break free from the Vault and created problems for the Avengers.

Acolytes
Frenzy eventually found acceptance under Magneto's teachings, joining the ranks of the second incarnation of the Acolytes. As was common among the Acolytes, she relinquished her codename, preferring to be called by her last name, Cargill. Their first mission was to capture a child with latent mutant powers from Our Mother of the Sacred Heart, a school. During the mission, Cargill killed Sharon Friedlander, and with her teammates Unuscione and the Kleinstocks, battled the gold X-Men team. Having history with Gambit (they met and clashed during a mission when they were mercenaries-for-hire), she immediately went after him and Bishop. However, Gambit was able to defeat her by hitting her with a kinetically charged tire. (The hinted relationship between Cargill and Gambit was supposedly going to be elaborated on in Fabian Nicieza's Gambit series, but it was canceled before he could get around to it.) The Acolytes were able to retreat, but fought the X-Men once again later that week. There, Cargill battled Iceman, commenting on how she has changed since her days with the Alliance of Evil, but Iceman was able to knock her unconscious using his newly acquired ice powers. Later, Cargill attempted to murder Senator Kelly, but was electrocuted by Wolfsbane.

After Magneto was revealed to be alive, Cargill was among the Acolytes who quickly turned on Fabian Cortez and joined Magneto in his mutant sanctuary, Avalon. While on a mission to recruit mutants to their cause, Cargill, along with Milan and Unuscione, found the young, meek boy Neophyte. After his betrayal of the Acolytes, Cargill was quick to vote guilty at his trial. During the Fall of Avalon, Cargill allied herself with long-time enemy Cyclops in order to survive, and she and her fellow Acolytes were able to escape the destroyed space station in time. They crash landed in Australia but were given to the authorities.

The Acolytes escaped prison and found the remains of Avalon, worshiping it and the return of Magneto. Exodus eventually took over leadership of the Acolytes, and Cargill participated in the attack on Mount Wundagore, the High Evolutionary's base of operations.

Mind-controlled
After the Acolytes disbanded, Cargill became the ambassador of Genosha to the United Nations and served as Magneto's right-hand woman.  When the Avengers infiltrated Genosha, Cargill attacked She-Hulk with a punch that sent She-Hulk flying. After confronting Quicksilver over his choices with his father, Cargill was defeated by Scarlet Witch. Later, Cargill appeared on television, ordering that every country pledge loyalty to Magneto in order to be given some autonomy. She was eventually captured by the government in an attempt to find out more of Magneto's plans, but she refused to speak. Jean Grey freed Cargill and mind-controlled her. Cargill's knowledge of Genosha helped the X-Men find Magneto's base. The inexperienced X-Men attacked but were quickly defeated. Cargill was used against her will to battle Magneto, but she was ultimately constrained with a metal pillar. After Magneto's defeat, Cargill was freed from her mind-control, where she immediately left the X-Mansion.

After M-Day
Frenzy is one of the few mutants left after M-Day. She resurfaces alongside Random and Tempo as  part of a new team of Acolytes led by Exodus. During their first mission, she is sent to distract the X-Men with Tempo, and succeeds in defeating Rogue. She is defeated by the combined effort of Mystique, Northstar, and Aurora by being thrown out of the S.H.I.E.L.D. Helicarrier.

Allied with Sinister
She regrouped with Exodus as he pledged his allegiance to Mister Sinister, and attacked the X-Mansion with her teammates in search of the Destiny Diaries. After discovering the copies in the mansion were fake, Frenzy and the Acolytes battled Shadowcat, Colossus, and the New X-Men. Frenzy, disgusted with Hellion's disrespect, immediately defeated him, and later battled X-23, who was able to draw blood from Frenzy's steel-hard skin. The Acolytes defeated the X-Men and returned to Mr. Sinister, with their mission being a failure.

During Messiah Complex, Frenzy joined in the battle against the X-Teams, most often battling Colossus.

Divided We Stand
After the events of Messiah Complex, she escaped with the other Acolytes and Professor X's body, taking him to an unknown part of the world. Frenzy in particular did not want anything to do with Professor Xavier, and instead wished to kill him.  After arguing with her fellow Acolytes over the matter, Frenzy confronted Xavier, Omega Sentinel, and a depowered Magneto, and attacked, severely damaging Omega Sentinel. She was stopped by Magneto, who used a surgical laser on Frenzy's eye to fry her brain. While Xavier thought she was dead, Magneto revealed she is most likely alive. Exodus, upon learning of this, swore to destroy Magneto.

When Xavier returned to the Acolytes' headquarters, he brought Frenzy out of her coma, claiming her "friends missed her."  She immediately attempted to kill Xavier, but Xavier warned her if she touched him she would sleep for another year. After Exodus decided to disband the Acolytes, Frenzy angrily deemed him and the other Acolytes cowards, believing them to be giving up simply because the odds were against them.  She and Unuscione were the only Acolytes to oppose the notion of disbanding.

Resident of Utopia
Frenzy is seen along with Nekra in the riots in San Francisco by Karma, who tells them to behave. Ms. Marvel arrives and blasts Nekra and Frenzy, taking them out. After this she moves along with many other mutants to the island of Utopia. During the final fight against the Dark Avengers, Frenzy teams up with Nekra and Bling! against Ms. Marvel. Frenzy was later one of the mutants, who were rallied by Cyclops to fight against the attacking Nimrods.

Becoming an X-Man
Following the end of Age of X, an alternate timeline in which she was married to Cyclops, Joanna had trouble adjusting back to normal life, as her experiences as a more heroic figure have had a profound effect on her. She confronted Cyclops about the time they shared together in the fictitious universe, but he rejected her; despite this, she refused to have her memory wiped of the experience unlike many other citizens of Utopia. Frenzy then starts dressing as her Age of X counterpart and decides that she wants to become an X-Man.

Joining Rogue's squad of X-Men, Frenzy assists in tracking down Legion's escaped personalities. Under the influence of Susan in Sunshine; Frenzy and Gambit share a kiss. After bringing together all of Legion's rogue personalities, Frenzy accompanies Rogue, Gambit and Magneto into space to rescue Havok, Polaris and Marvel Girl.

Jean Grey School For Higher Learning
Following the X-Men's Schism, Frenzy decided to leave Utopia alongside Wolverine and other former X-Men to re-open the Jean Grey School For Higher Learning. Her reasons for leaving were based on her love for Cyclops, not wanting to fall back into old habits and to make a positive change in her life. Before departing Utopia, she assists Rogue and a few other X-Men in saving Ariel.

Frenzy allied herself with Wolverine's team in the initial fight between the Avengers and X-Men. Choosing to stay with the Students of the Jean Grey School for Higher Learning, Frenzy was soon drawn into the conflict when a team Avengers consisting of She-Hulk, Falcon and Moon Knight were sent to watch over the Mutants. This soon escalated into a fight between the two teams. When the Phoenix Five returned to Earth to remake the Earth into their own Utopia, Frenzy assisted them in helping to dismantle a Militia force in Narobia.

Allied with the Inhumans
Following the release of the Terrigen Mist clouds on Earth and their threat to Mutants, Frenzy chose to ally herself with Crystal and her team of Inhumans. Working as a covert agent of the Inhumans she helped to save countless Mutants in danger of the Terrigen Clouds.

Dawn of X
In the new status quo for mutants post House of X and Powers of X, Professor X and Magneto invite all mutants to live on Krakoa and welcome even former enemies into their fold. Frenzy is seen amongst the crowd of villainous mutants that arrive on Krakoa via portal.

Some time later, she joins the newly reinstated S.W.O.R.D. satellite (post X of Swords) as Intergalactic Ambassador.

Powers and abilities
Frenzy is a mutant who possesses steel-hard skin that makes her resistant to most forms of conventional physical injury, as well as temperature extremes. She has been shown to merely shrug off being covered in flames and is also highly resistant to microwave radiation, though adamantium has been shown to puncture her skin after an encounter with X-23. Frenzy also possesses superhuman strength, approximately on par with Spider-Man.  In later years she has been depicted as strong enough to battle characters like Rogue, and She-Hulk.

Other versions

Age of X
In the 2011 "Age of X" storyline, Joanna was captured after various attacks against anti-mutant groups and is incarcerated on Ryker's Island. She is later freed by Cyclops, who later marries her.

Marvel Zombies
In 2006, Cargill appears in the Marvel Zombies miniseries, along with some of her fellow Acolytes (Fabian Cortez, Scanner, Lisa Hendricks, Reynolds, Burns) and Forge as the few survivors hiding in Asteroid M from the hordes of zombies on Earth. She and the others make a few trips down to Earth in order to gather intelligence.

Weapon X
In the Days of Future Now storyline, Cargill appears as a member of Gene Nation.

What If
Cargill appears in two issues of What If. The first depicts her as a member of the X-Men, but she eventually splits off with other villains such as Toad, Unus the Untouchable, and Pyro. Another has her fleeing for her life after confronting Apocalypse's Horseman of Death, Archangel, who thinks she is unworthy of living.

X-Men: The End
Cargill also appears in X-Men: The End as a member of the X-Men who battle the Skrulls that took the forms of Genesis, Stryfe, and the Goblin Queen. She was one of the few survivors after the X-Mansion had been destroyed.

In other media

Television
 Cargill appeared in the "Sanctuary" two-parter of the X-Men animated series. Though she did not have any speaking lines, she was a prominent member of the Acolytes. She also had a cameo in the first part of "One Man's Worth", where she was a member of the Mutant Resistance, but retained her Acolyte outfit.

Novels
 In the X-Men novel Mutant Empire, Cargill is among the Acolytes. She notes how much she likes Pyro's books.

References

External links
 Joanna Cargill at Marvel.com
 UncannyXmen.net Spotlight On Frenzy

African-American superheroes
Characters created by Bob Layton
Characters created by Keith Pollard
Comics characters introduced in 1986
Fictional mercenaries in comics
Fictional victims of domestic abuse
Marvel Comics American superheroes
Marvel Comics characters with superhuman strength
Marvel Comics female superheroes
Marvel Comics female supervillains
Marvel Comics mutants